Jean Carlo Tragodara Gálvez (born 16 December 1985 in Lima) is a Peruvian footballer who plays as a midfielder for Sport Boys.

Tragodara previously played for Universitario de Deportes, Atlético Minero, Inti Gas Deportes, Universidad César Vallejo, Universidad Técnica de Cajamarca, Colombian club Once Caldas and Comerciantes Unidos

International goals

References

External links
 
 
 

1985 births
Living people
Footballers from Lima
Association football midfielders
Peruvian footballers
Peru international footballers
Peruvian Primera División players
Categoría Primera A players
Club Universitario de Deportes footballers
Sport Áncash footballers
Atlético Minero footballers
Ayacucho FC footballers
Club Alianza Lima footballers
Once Caldas footballers
Club Deportivo Universidad César Vallejo footballers
Universidad Técnica de Cajamarca footballers
León de Huánuco footballers
Comerciantes Unidos footballers
Real Garcilaso footballers
Sport Boys footballers
Peruvian expatriate footballers
Expatriate footballers in Colombia